A llama is a  South American animal.
Llama may also refer to:

 LLaMA, a large language model from Meta AI
 Large Latin American Millimeter Array (LLAMA), an astronomical radio observatory
 Llama, a term for four strikes in a row in ten-pin bowling
Llama (band), American alternative rock band from Nashville, Tennessee
Llama firearms, a Spanish firearms company founded in 1904
Library Leadership and Management Association, a division of the American Library Association
 "Llama", an episode of the television series Teletubbies
Llama District (disambiguation), in Peru

See also
Llamas (disambiguation)
Lama (disambiguation)
Lamas (disambiguation)
Lamma Island
Lammas
Llamasoft, a software company
Ilama (disambiguation), or ilama